Courtney Stewart is an American record industry executive, founder of Keep Cool Records.

Courtney Stewart may also refer to:
 Courtney Stewart, American architect, designer of the Coca-Cola Bottling Plant in Fort Lauderdale, Florida
 Courtney Stewart, Scottish professional wrestler known by her ring name Isla Dawn
Courtney Stewart (dramatist), Australian actor and theatre director, artistic director of La Boite Theatre Company from 2022
 Courtney Stewart, cheerleader, driver of the car in which American baseball player Nick Adenhart was killed in 2009

See also
Courtenay Stewart (born 1985), Canadian synchronised swimming athlete